Siege is a 1940 documentary short about the Siege of Warsaw by the Wehrmacht at the start of World War II. It was shot by Julien Bryan, a Pennsylvanian photographer and cameraman who later established the International Film Foundation.

Siege was nominated for an Oscar for Best One-reel Short at the 13th Academy Awards in 1941, and, in 2006, it was named to the National Film Registry by the Librarian of Congress as "a unique, horrifying record of the dreadful brutality of war".

References

External links
 
 complete film
 Siege on YouTube, posted by the United States Holocaust Memorial Museum

1940 films
History of Warsaw
United States National Film Registry films
1940 documentary films
Black-and-white documentary films
Invasion of Poland
Documentary films about World War II
RKO Pictures short films
Articles containing video clips
Documentary films about Poland
American short documentary films
American black-and-white films
1940s short documentary films
1940s American films